"Fuck, I'm Lonely" (also released in a censored version as "Lonely", both titles stylized in lowercase) is a song by American singer Lauv featuring English singer Anne-Marie. It was released as a single on August 1, 2019, alongside the trailer for the third season of the Netflix series 13 Reasons Why, whose soundtrack features the song. It is also included on Lauv's debut album, How I'm Feeling.

Background
Lauv met Anne-Marie after they both performed at the Summertime Ball at Wembley Stadium, London, and called the lyrics "pretty self-explanatory" as well as about "missing someone you used to hook up with" and his "least deep and mysterious song". He made the beat on his laptop in an hour while at an airport, and said the title of the song "came out of nowhere" in a conversation with his friends. Anne-Marie said "I never really like admitting that I miss someone after a break up. So here's a song that does it for me."

Music Video 
The video features both singers among other people at an apartment thinking what to do for the night. Most of them help do people's clothes.

Critical reception
Clash called the song "brutally honest but ultra-infectious" and elaborated that Lauv has "the ability to make the bleakest emotions seem beautiful" as well as a "consistent dichotomy running through his work". i-D felt that the track is "both dangerously catchy and sort of sad when you think about it", describing it a song that "forces you to have a 4am, Sunday morning epiphany as you melt into the sofa at an afterparty". MTV wrote the song is "Sonically and thematically, [...] right in line with Lauv's other recent singles [...] Over a quirky combination of synths, he and Anne-Marie ruminate on their exes and wallow in their loneliness".

Charts

Weekly charts

Year-end charts

Certifications

References

2019 singles
2019 songs
Lauv songs
Anne-Marie (singer) songs
Songs from television series
Songs written by Lauv
Songs written by Michael Pollack (musician)